Pseudocellus platnicki is a species of ricinulei classed in the family of Ricinoididae.

References 

Ricinulei
Animals described in 2011